Choctaw High School is a public high school (grades 9-12) in Choctaw, Oklahoma.

As of 2020, it has 1,602 students and 81.84 teachers (FTE) for a student-teacher ratio of approximately 20:1. In 2017 it was ranked as the 28th best high school in Oklahoma by US News. It is the only high school in the Choctaw-Nicoma Park School District.

Athletics 
Choctaw offers the following sports to its students:

Baseball
Basketball
Cheer
Cross Country
Football
Golf
Power Lifting
Soccer
Softball
Swimming
Tennis
Track
Volleyball
Wrestling

State Championships

References 

Public high schools in Oklahoma
Schools in Oklahoma County, Oklahoma